WRKD-LP is a Variety Hits formatted broadcast radio station licensed to Rockford, Ohio and serving Rockford, Mendon, and Ohio City in Ohio. WRKD-LP is owned and operated by WRKD-LP Community Radio.

References

External links
 101-3 RKD Online
 

RKD-LP
2014 establishments in Ohio
Adult hits radio stations in the United States
Radio stations established in 2014
RKD-LP